Jannatabad (also Romanized as Jannatābād and Jennatābād) is a village in Zahray-ye Bala Rural District, in the Central District of Buin Zahra County, Qazvin Province, Iran. At the 2006 census, its population was 205, in 41 families.

References 

Populated places in Buin Zahra County